Beosus quadripunctatus is a species of dirt-colored seed bug in the family Rhyparochromidae, found in Europe, the Middle East, and western Asia.

Subspecies
These two subspecies belong to the species Beosus quadripunctatus:
 Beosus quadripunctatus nigripes Tamanini, 1946
 Beosus quadripunctatus quadripunctatus Muller, 1766

References

External links

 

Rhyparochromidae
Insects described in 1766
Hemiptera of Europe
Hemiptera of Asia